The Australia national cricket team were in England from June to September 2013 for a tour that consisted of five Test matches, five One Day International matches and two Twenty20 International matches. The Test series was for the Ashes.

Squads

† Late addition to the squad

ICC Champions Trophy

The tour started in June with the 2013 ICC Champions Trophy, in which Australia were drawn in Group A with England, New Zealand and Sri Lanka. They lost to England and Sri Lanka, and the game against New Zealand was washed out, leaving Australia at the bottom of Group A with 1 point and eliminated from the tournament.

Tour matches

First-class: Somerset v Australians

First-class: Worcestershire v Australians

First-class: Sussex v Australians

Two-day: England Lions v Australians

Test series

First Test

Second Test

Third Test

Fourth Test

Fifth Test

T20I series

1st T20I

2nd T20I

ODI series

1st ODI

2nd ODI

3rd ODI

4th ODI

5th ODI

Broadcasters

References

External links
Australia tour of England and Scotland, 2013 at ESPNcricinfo.com

2013
2013 in English cricket
International cricket competitions in 2013